Ladislav Jirasek (24 June 1927 – 31 July 1977) was a German footballer who played for VfB Stuttgart, Bayern Munich, Borussia Neunkirchen and the Saarland national team as a goalkeeper.

References

1927 births
1977 deaths
German footballers
Saar footballers
Saarland international footballers
Saarland B international footballers
VfB Stuttgart players
FC Bayern Munich footballers
Borussia Neunkirchen players
Association football goalkeepers
Footballers from Prague
Czechoslovak emigrants to Germany